Goleytar (also known as Goleytār Bolāghī) is a village in Quri Chay-ye Sharqi Rural District, in the Central District of Charuymaq County, East Azerbaijan Province, Iran. At the 2006 census, its population was 162, in 23 families.

References 

Populated places in Charuymaq County